Joseph Jean Luc Benoît Brunet (born August 24, 1968) is a Canadian former professional ice hockey player.  He was drafted by the Montreal Canadiens in the second round, 27th overall, of the 1986 NHL Entry Draft.

Playing career
After playing three seasons for the Hull Olympiques of the QMJHL, Brunet made his professional debut with the American Hockey League's Sherbrooke Canadiens in the 1988–89 season.  He also made his NHL debut with Montreal that same season, appearing in two games and recording one assist.

Brunet became a fixture on the Canadiens' roster, playing with them until the 2001–02 season. He became a favorite of the hometown fans due to his local roots and path to the NHL as well as his work as a defensive forward which made him a constant on the team's penalty killing unit.  During the 2001–02 season, he was traded to the Dallas Stars, along with Martin Ručinský, in exchange for Donald Audette and Shaun Van Allen.  Brunet appeared in 32 games with the Stars before being traded again, this time to the Ottawa Senators in exchange for a pick in the 2003 NHL Entry Draft.  Brunet finished the season with Ottawa, and retired afterward.

In his NHL career, Brunet appeared in 539 games.  He scored 101 goals and added 161 assists.  He also appeared in 54 playoff games, scoring five goals and adding 20 assists.  He was a member of the Canadiens team that won the Stanley Cup in 1993.

Colour commentator
A few years after his retirement, Brunet was hired as a colour commentator for the French-language sports network RDS for NHL games that did not involve the Montreal Canadiens. For the 2008-09 season he was promoted as the main colour commentator alongside play-by-play man Pierre Houde for all Montreal Canadiens games, replacing longtime veteran Yvon Pedneault.

Career statistics

External links

1968 births
Living people
Canadian colour commentators
Canadian ice hockey left wingers
Dallas Stars players
Fredericton Canadiens players
Hull Olympiques players
Ice hockey people from Quebec
Montreal Canadiens announcers
Montreal Canadiens draft picks
Montreal Canadiens players
National Hockey League broadcasters
Ottawa Senators players
People from Pointe-Claire
Sherbrooke Canadiens players
Stanley Cup champions
Utah Grizzlies (AHL) players